Dusted is the debut album by the alternative rock band the Gin Blossoms. It was released through San Jacinto Records, a small independent label as a 12-song tape and record in 1989.

Six of the songs on this album were re-recorded by the band after they signed to A&M Records. "Keli Richards" and "Angels Tonight" were re-recorded and included on the 1991 EP Up and Crumbling. "Hey Jealousy", "Found Out About You", "Cajun Song", and "Lost Horizons" were re-recorded and included in Gin Blossoms' 1992 album, New Miserable Experience.

The album in general has a faster tempo and a less produced sound than New Miserable Experience.

Track listing

Personnel
Robin Wilson - lead vocals, acoustic guitar, tambourine
Doug Hopkins - lead guitar
Jesse Valenzuela - rhythm guitar, background vocals, lead vocals on "Something Wrong", "I Can Sleep", and "Fireworks"
Bill Leen - bass guitar
Phillip Rhodes - drums
James SK Wān - bamboo flute

References

External links
 

Gin Blossoms albums
1989 debut albums
Self-released albums